Flylight Airsports is a British aircraft manufacturer based in Northamptonshire. The company specializes in the design and manufacture of ultralight trikes and is noted for its line of retractable gear single seat aircraft, such as the Dragonfly. The company also acts as importer for several lines of aircraft including the Best Off Skyranger and the Aeros line of hang gliders.

In 2011 the company experimented with an electric aircraft derivative of the Dragonfly, designated the Flylight E-Dragon.

Aircraft

References

External links

Aircraft manufacturers of the United Kingdom
Ultralight trikes